Gabriel Isaac Cleur (born 31 January 1998) is an Australian professional footballer who plays as a right back for Western Sydney Wanderers.

Career
Cleur made his professional debut for Virtus Entella in the Serie B as a late substitute in the final round of the 2016–17 season. He signed a new contract with Entella in September 2017, extending to 2021.

In January 2018, Cleur moved on a six-month loan to Serie C side Robur Siena.

On 26 June 2019, he joined Alessandria on loan.

In June 2022, it was confirmed that Cleur would leave Virtus Entella to join A-League Men side Western Sydney Wanderers.

Career statistics

See also
 List of foreign Serie B players

References

External links

Gabriel Cleur profile at Entella.it (in Italian)

1998 births
Living people
Soccer players from Sydney
Australian soccer players
Association football defenders
Serie B players
Serie C players
Virtus Entella players
A.C.N. Siena 1904 players
U.S. Alessandria Calcio 1912 players
Western Sydney Wanderers FC players
Australian expatriate soccer players
Australian expatriate sportspeople in Italy
Expatriate footballers in Italy
Australian people of French descent